XHPCO-FM is a community radio station on 107.5 FM in Paracho, Michoacán. It is known as Radio Mintzita.

XHPCO was permitted on February 19, 2010.

References

Radio stations in Michoacán